Robert Colls is Professor of Cultural History at De Montfort University, Leicester. Before that he was Professor of English History at Leicester University. He is married with two adult children.

Personal History 
He was born in 1949 in South Shields, where he attended Laygate Lane Junior School and the Grammar Technical School for Boys. His father worked as a driller at the Tyne Dock Engineering Company, a ship repair yard. His mother worked at Harton Hospital as a ward assistant - a job she loved. Colls says that the Westoe Methodist Young People's Fellowship (Sundays) taught him how to reflect, and Talbot Road Methodist Youth Club (Fridays) taught him how to dance.

After studying at the University of Sussex and undertaking Voluntary Service Overseas in Blue Nile Province, Sudan, he worked for a PhD at the University of York under Professor G. A. Williams. Jobs followed at Loughton College (1975–79) and the University of Leicester (1979-2012) before joining the International Centre for Sports History and Culture at De Montfort in October 2012.

Main interests
Colls's main interests are cultural and intellectual history. In recent years this has taken him into the study of regional and national identities. He also has a longstanding interest in the history of the English working class. His long essay ‘When We Lived in Communities’ (Cities of Ideas 2004) explains the intelligence that sustained industrial communities and, along with ‘English Journeys’ (Prospect July 2007) is the nearest he has come to memoir.

Written work
Colls's first book The Collier's Rant (1977) explored popular song and image as expressed in 19th-century broadsheets and music hall. The Pitmen of the Northern Coalfield 1790-1850 (1987) tried to bring the miners into the orbit of E P Thompson's path-breaking The Making of the English Working Class. Geordies. Roots of Regionalism (1992) is a collection of regionalist essays edited with Bill Lancaster to which Colls contributed a hefty piece. Newcastle upon Tyne: A Modern History (2001), and Northumbria. History and Identity 547-2000 (2007) completed his northern trilogy.

Englishness: Politics and Letters 1880-1920 (1986), co-edited with Philip Dodd, was first of a new wave of studies on English national identity and was published in a second edition by Bloomsbury in 2014 with a new Introduction by the editors and an Afterword by Will Self. Colls' book Identity of England (2002) received significant critical acclaim.

George Orwell: English Rebel, was published by Oxford University Press in 2013. D J Taylor in The Guardian thought it was a "prime ornament of Orwell Studies". A N Wilson in The Spectator said he thought it was "the most sensible and systematic interpretation of Orwell I have ever read". Simon Heffer in The Daily Telegraph said that "If there is a better book on George Orwell I have yet to discover it". David Aaronovitch in the New Statesman called Colls "a lovely writer, fearless in a way that academics too often are not". David Evans in The Independent remarked that "Colls writes like an offbeat mixture of Isaiah Berlin and Clive James" which Colls was happy to take as a compliment.

This Sporting Life: Sport and Liberty in England 1760-1960 was published by Oxford University Press in 2020. It won the Aberdare Prize as, in the words of the judges, "a compelling, evocative and unique explication of what sport has meant to the English". It was one of Dominic Sandbrook’s Best History Books of the Year in The Sunday Times and Melvyn Bragg’s Book of the Year in the New Statesman. Alex Massie in The Spectator thought it was "much more than a history of sport; it is really an alternative history of England". In the same year, he wrote the introduction to the new Penguin edition of Animal Farm.

TV Radio and Journalism 
He writes regularly for The New Statesman  and The Literary Review.

“He has written and broadcast for television and radio, including The South Bank Show (on Lee Hall), Who Do You Think You Are? (on Alan Carr), Analysis (on the English Gentleman), The Verb (on intellectuals), In Our Time (on Animal Farm), From Our Own Correspondent (on France and the USA), Ramblings (with Clare Balding in the steps of the Jarrow Marchers), The Matter of the North (with Melvyn Bragg), Start the Week (on Orwell), Newsnight (on Brexit), A House Through Time (with David Olusuga), British Council (Durham Miners’ Gala), GNR Films (Great North Run), Unherd (on Levelling Up),The Rest is History (on Orwell), and Radio Free Europe (on Orwell).”

He has brought to this side of his work an appreciation of popular culture influenced both by his understanding of its critical importance and also by his sheer enjoyment of it (notably pop music, film, Leicester City and Newcastle United).

He has also contributed to German, French, Spanish, US and Italian TV, newspapers and radio on subjects ranging from English regionalism and Scottish independence to Brexit and Leicester City's crowning as English Champions in 2016

Academia
He has been:

 a Fulbright Scholar at Mississippi (1992-3)

 a visiting fellow at St John's College, Oxford (2004)
 a Leverhulme Senior Research Fellow (2005-7)
 a Mellon Fellow at Yale (2007)
 a Gambrinus Fellow at Dortmund (2007)

Publications

Forthcoming 
Colls is currently writing an Oxford Very Short Introduction to Orwell.

References

Academics of the University of Leicester
Living people
Year of birth missing (living people)